Naquite is an iron silicide mineral with the formula FeSi. It was discovered in the 1960s in Donetsk Oblast in Soviet Union, and named fersilicite, but was not approved by the International Mineralogical Association. It was later rediscovered in Nagqu, Tibet. Naquite occurs together with other rare iron silicide minerals, xifengite (Fe5Si3) and linzhiite (FeSi2).

References

Iron minerals
Cubic minerals
Minerals in space group 198
Minerals described in 2012